Reverse waterfall is a phenomenon in which water is blown upward due to strong wind in waterfalls giving an apparent perception of water flowing upwards. Strong blowing of wind above about 75 km/hr can cause such phenomena.

List of observed location

These have been observed in Australia, India, Japan, the UK, the USA and various parts of the world where there is chance of strong wind such as:

 India: 
 A waterfall at Naneghat in Malshej Ghat Road near Mumbai
 Samrad village in the Sandhan Valley has waterfalls showing reverse waterfall during monsoon.
 Amboli hills near Belgaum have various waterfalls that becomes active in monsoon which gets blown upward due to strong wind.
 Japan: Shiretoko National Park in Japan has Furepe Falls to the Sea of Okhotosk. This fall also gets reversed during strong wind.
 Brazil: In the Chapada Diamantina National Park the Cachoeira da Fumaça (Smoke Waterfall) shows the phenomenon.
 Chile: The waterfall in Talca shows the phenomenon.
 United Kingdom: Has been observed in the Peak District amongst other highland areas, commonly in autumn and winter when strong winds can occur. The Kinder Downfall waterfall in the Kinder Scout area of the Peak District regularly exhibits this phenomenon.
 United States: 
 Observed on a cliff in Ivins, Utah, Utah on 16 January, 2023. Winds created updrafts strong enough to spray the waterfall upwards to the plateau.
 The Waipuhia Falls in Oahu, Hawaii gets reversed due to north-easterly trade winds.

References

Earth phenomena
Waterfalls